The Zhukovsky – Gagarin Air Force Academy is a Russian military institution of higher education run by the Ministry of Defence. The full name is Russian Air Force Military Educational and Scientific Center Air Force Academy Professor N.E. Zhukovsky and Major Y.A. Gagarin based in Voronezh, Voronezh Oblast in southern Russia.

History

Roots
The ancestor of the current academy is considered to be the Military Aerodrome Technical School of the Air Force in Stalingrad, the decision to open which was made at the end of 1948 by the General Staff of the Armed Forces of the USSR, and the opening took place on January 1, 1950.

In 1954, the school was relocated to the city of Michurinsk, Tambov Region (Voronezh Military District). In 1963, the educational institution was renamed the Michurinsk Military Aviation Technical School, and a few months later it moved to Voronezh and received a new name,  Voronezh Military Aviation Technical School.

In 1998, the school was transformed into the Voronezh Military Aviation Engineering Institute, and five years later it received a new name - the Voronezh Higher Military Aviation Engineering School (Military Institute).

In August 2006, the Voronezh Higher Military Engineering School of Radio Electronics was incorporated to the school.

Zhukovsky - Gagarin Academy in Moscow 

The Academy was established in 2008 after the merger of the Zhukovsky Air Force Engineering Academy and the Gagarin Air Force Academy by Government Resolution on March 7, 2008. The Gagarin Academy specialized in preparing high-ranking commanding officers, while the Zhukovsky Academy focused on aviation engineering.

In 2008-2009, when the Ministry of Defence continued the process of consolidation of its training and research institutions, six other military schools were named affiliated (separate organizational units) entities and later subsidiaries of the academy:
  (named after twice Hero of the Soviet Union, pilot-cosmonaut V. M. Komarov)
  (named after Hero of the Soviet Union A. K. Serov)
 Syzran Higher Military Aviation School
  
 Chelyabinsk Red Banner Military Aviation Institute of Navigators
 Yaroslavl Higher Military School of Anti-Aircraft Warfare

The total number of employees (military and civilian personnel) of the academy (with subsidiaries) was set at 37,481 people.

The academy offered programs in a variety of fields:
 Command and control of military units and formations 
 The study of natural resources by means of aerospace 
 Electronics and automation of physical facilities 
 Robotic systems of aircraft weapons 
 Technical maintenance of aircraft and engines 
 Technical maintenance of aircraft electrical systems and flight control and navigation systems 
 Technical maintenance of the mobile radio equipment 
 Metrology and metrological support 
 Means of electronic warfare 
 The software of computers and automated systems

Merger
Order of the Russian Minister of Defence on 12 July 2011, a decision was made to reform the academy. It directed to transfer within 45 days (until September 1, 2011), "the preparation of students from the Zhukovsky – Gagarin Air Force Academy (Moscow and Monino) to the Military Aviation Engineering University" located in Voronezh.

The same order liquidated subsidiaries of the academy in the cities of Yeysk (Krasnodar Krai), Saint Petersburg and Chelyabinsk. 

De jure, the order has not eliminated Zhukovsky – Gagarin Air Force Academy. However, it happened de facto, since the educational activities were the main purpose of the academy, and the transfer of preparation of students  to  the Military Aviation Engineering University (Voronezh) in practice meant an end to the existence of the Zhukovsky – Gagarin Air Force Academy.

The vast majority of the Zhukovsky – Gagarin Air Force Academy faculty did not move to Voronezh. More than fifteen hundred people were laid off in Monino. Order of the Ministry of Defence has caused fierce criticism from the scientific and pedagogical community of the academy. Exponent of this position is the head of the working group of the Academic Council of the academy Ivan Naidenov (Lieutenant General of aviation, retired, a former deputy chief of the Gagarin Academy for Education and Science, Doctor of Military Sciences, Professor, Honored Scientist of Russia, and earlier - Head of the Russian Air Force Research Center for the Command and Control Systems (:ru:Научно-исследовательский центр систем управления ВВС) a part of the 30th Central Scientific Research Institute, Ministry of Defence (Russia).

The need for reorganization of the Russian Air Force research and educational institutions has been realized at all levels of military establishment since the late 1980s. Options discussed included the reorganization and different forms of association of Zhukovsky Air Force Engineering Academy and Gagarin Air Force Academy, and sometimes 30th Central Scientific Research Institute. The criteria for the effectiveness of the reforms were not only the reductions in personnel and budget, but also sustainment of the scientific and pedagogical potential of research and educational institutions. According to Ivan Naidenov, the reform of 2011 resulted in almost complete loss of the Zhukovsky – Gagarin Air Force Academy potential, and restoration of the lost positions in the Military Aviation Engineering University (Voronezh) will take at least 10 – 15 years.

At the end of September 2011, when implementation of the Defence Ministry Order N 1136 was in full swing (academy equipment was transported to Voronezh, employees at the academy in Monino were laid off), Government Resolution of September 27, 2011 № 1639-r was issued. This resolution ordered the creation of Federal State Governmental military educational institution of higher education Zhukovsky – Gagarin Air Force Academy of the Defense Ministry "by changing the type of the existing" federal state of military educational institutions of higher education Zhukovsky – Gagarin Air Force Academy, while maintaining its main purpose of activity and total number of full-time employees. 

In 2010, the Federal State Research and Testing Center for Electronic Warfare and Evaluation of the Efficiency of Visibility Reduction was attached to the University. On September 1, 2011, by order of the Ministry of Defense of the Russian Federation, the university received the training of trained officers of the operational-tactical level from the Air Force Academy named after Professor Zhukovsky and  Gagarin.

On February 21, 2020, the Russian Minister of Defense, General of the Army Sergey Shoygu, presented the Academy with the Order of Zhukov for merits in strengthening the country's defense capability and training qualified military personnel.

Structure

Faculties and branches
Command
Faculty of Aviation Support
Hydrometeorological Faculty
Faculty of Aerodrome Technical Support of Aviation
Faculty of Engineering and Airfield Support
Faculty of Unmanned Aircraft
Faculty of Electronic Warfare (and Information Security)
Faculty of Aircraft
Faculty of Aviation Arms
Faculty of Aviation Equipment
Faculty of Aviation Radioelectronic Equipment
Faculty of Radio Engineering
Faculty of Aviation Communications
Faculty of Retraining and Continuing Education
Special Faculty
Syzran Higher Military Aviation School (branch of the Academy)
Chelyabinsk Red Banner Military Aviation Institute of Navigators (branch of the Academy)
Navigator Training Faculty
Faculty of Combat Aviation and Air Traffic Control

Academy band
The history of the cadet band began in 1936, when the Chelyabinsk Higher Military Aviation School of Navigators was created. Major I. Vasilyev was its first director and laid the glorious traditions of performing art and musical culture. The band is a laureate of more than one competition of military bands of the Volga-Ural Military District. As part of the consolidated band of the Central Military District, as part of the festival of military bands, it is included in the Guinness Book of Records as a member of the largest orchestra performing the FIFA Anthem. The band takes part in all the ceremonies and military parades held in the city of Chelyabinsk, dedicated to the Victory in the Great Patriotic War.

See also
United States Air Force Academy
Royal Canadian Air Force Academy
École de l'air
PLA Air Force Aviation University
Royal Air Force College
Gagarin Air Force Academy
Zhukovsky Air Force Engineering Academy

References

Air force academies
Military academies of Russia
Military education and training in Russia
Military academies of the Soviet Union
Soviet Air Forces education and training